USCGC Yellowfin (WPB-87319) is an  long  of the United States Coast Guard built by Bollinger Shipyards in Lockport, Louisiana. She was the nineteenth vessel in her class, which was so successful that the Coast Guard commissioned 73 cutters. 

She is homeported in Charleston, SC.

Design

Like her sister ships she was designed for a crew of ten on missions of up to five days.  She was designed for mixed-gender crews.  Her modest armament is a pair of M2 Browning Heavy Machine Guns.  She was designed with a stern launching ramp that allows her to deploy and retrieve a high-speed pursuit boat without first coming to a stop.  Only a single crew member is required to remain on deck when the pursuit boat is being launched or retrieved.

Operational history

In September 2017 Yellowfin was one of the 13 Coast Guard cutters that was tasked to assist Puerto Rico respond to Hurricane Maria.

On November 30, 2018, Yellowfin took part in a remembrance ceremony in Charleston, South Carolina, for those lost in the wreck of the pleasure craft Morning Dew, which sank with all hands on December 29, 1997.

References

Marine Protector-class coastal patrol boats
Ships built in Lockport, Louisiana
2000 ships